In Iran, short dates are written as year/month/day, for example , and long dates as day month name year from right to left, for example . Both two-digit and four-digit years are valid but months and days are not usually padded with leading zeros.

References 

Time in Iran
Iran